The Sderot railway station is a railway station located near the southern entrance to Sderot, Israel. It is situated on the Ashkelon–Beersheba railway.

The station was designed by Ami Shinar – Amir Mann Architects as a rocket-resistant building because of the sensitive security situation in Sderot during the last decade given its proximity to the Gaza Strip. This unusual need eventually led the architects to create an unusual design consisting of an irregular structure emerging from the ground.

References

External links

Railway stations in Southern District (Israel)
Railway stations opened in 2013
2013 establishments in Israel
Sderot